Reinier Craeyvanger (February 29, 1812 in Utrecht –  January 10, 1880 in Amsterdam), was a 19th-century Dutch painter and etcher who was also a gifted musician.

Biography
He was born in Utrecht as the younger brother of Gijsbertus and later became the pupil of Jan Willem Pieneman. He etched his own sketches and collaborated with publishers on prints. He is also known for genre works and copies of old masters such as Jan Steen, Gerard Dou, and Frans van Mieris. He was a member of Arti et Amicitiae and served as chairman for five years. In 1848 he was one of the founders of the "Haagse Etsclub", a club for etchers in The Hague, where he lived a few years until 1850. In 1852 he was back in Amsterdam where he later died.

Selected paintings

External links

Reinier Craeyvanger on Artnet

References

1812 births
1880 deaths
19th-century Dutch painters
Dutch male painters
Artists from Utrecht
Dutch etchers
Dutch double-bassists
Dutch basses
Dutch cellists
Male double-bassists
19th-century Dutch male singers
19th-century Dutch male artists